Carey Alexander Davis  (born March 27, 1981) is a former American football fullback. He was signed by the Indianapolis Colts as an undrafted free agent in 2004. He played college football at Illinois.

Davis has also been a member of the Atlanta Falcons, Tampa Bay Buccaneers, Miami Dolphins, Pittsburgh Steelers, and Washington Redskins. He won a Super Bowl championship with the Steelers against the Arizona Cardinals during Super Bowl XLIII.

College career
Davis played college football at the University of Illinois where he played in 42 games having success in both receiving and running duties. He finished his career with 114 receptions for 751 yards and five touchdowns and running the ball he added 216 carries for 1,012 yards and one touchdown. He graduated in May 2003 with a degree in Leisure Studies/Sports Management.

Professional career

Indianapolis Colts
Davis was originally signed by the Indianapolis Colts as a rookie free agent on April 30, 2004 and spent a brief period on the active roster. He then was added to the roster of various teams, including the Atlanta Falcons, the Tampa Bay Buccaneers, and the Miami Dolphins, but received no playing time.

Pittsburgh Steelers

Davis signed a contract with the Pittsburgh Steelers on January 3, 2007. It was announced on September 7, 2007 that Davis would be the 2007 Opening Day starting fullback, beating out incumbent starter Dan Kreider. Kreider and Davis shared the starting position through the season until the Monday Night Football game against the Miami Dolphins, when Kreider tore his ACL. From that game forward, Davis was the starting fullback. When halfback Willie Parker went down with an injury in Week 16, Davis shared some snaps at halfback with Najeh Davenport. He finished the season having played in 16 games and rushing 17 times for 68 yards. In 2007, he led the team in special team tackles with 17.

During the 2008 season, his production declined as the Steelers offense became more pass-oriented. Midseason, he was replaced as starting fullback by Sean McHugh.

He was released on September 4, 2009, and then re-signed on September 29.

Washington Redskins
Davis was signed by the Redskins on August 22, 2010 to replace the injured Mike Sellers, but was later released on September 4, 2010.

Broadcasting career
Davis is the sideline reporter for Illinois Fighting Illini football broadcasts. He is also a frequent guest host on 101 ESPN Radio in his native St. Louis. On September 2, 2022 it was announced he would take over permanent co-hosting duties at 101 ESPN in St. Louis with co-host Randy Karraker on the station's morning drive show called The Opening Drive.

Personal life
He is the head football coach at Hazelwood Central High School.

References
6. https://www.101espn.com/episode/a-special-announcement-for-the-new-show-on-karraker-smallmon/

External links
Pittsburgh Steelers bio

 https://www.101espn.com/episode/a-special-announcement-for-the-new-show-on-karraker-smallmon/

1981 births
Living people
African-American players of American football
American football fullbacks
Illinois Fighting Illini football announcers
Illinois Fighting Illini football players
Indianapolis Colts players
Atlanta Falcons players
Tampa Bay Buccaneers players
Miami Dolphins players
Pittsburgh Steelers players
Washington Redskins players
21st-century African-American sportspeople
20th-century African-American people